Valentina Yakovlevna Kozlovskaya (born 18 April 1938) is a Russian chess player. She was awarded the title of Woman Grandmaster (WGM) by FIDE in 1976.

Chess career 
Kozlovskaya won the Women's Soviet Chess Championship in 1965. She was a member of the victorious Soviet team at the Women's Chess Olympiad in Havana 1966. She came second in the 1967 Women's Candidates Tournament. In the same year she placed second to women's world champion Nona Gaprindashvili in a women's international tournament at Kiev. In 1973 Kozlovskaya won the Women's Interzonal tournament and the next year, she lost the Candidates semifinal match to Irina Levitina. In 1976 Kozlovskaya won the RSFSR women's championship and in 1979, she shared first place with Ludmila Saunina. Kozlovskaya won the Women's World Senior Championship in 1996. In 2014, she won the European Senior Championship in the women's 65+ division, ahead of Nona Gaprindashvili.

Personal life 
Kozlovskaya is a biochemist by profession. She is the widow of Grandmaster Igor Bondarevsky.

References

External links 

Valentina Kozlovskaya chess games at 365Chess.com
Biography 

1938 births
Living people
Chess woman grandmasters
Russian female chess players
Soviet female chess players
World Senior Chess Champions
People from Yessentuki